Emory Hilliard Price (December 3, 1899 – February 11, 1976) was a U.S. Representative from Florida.

Biography
Born in Bostwick, Florida, Price attended the public schools of Duval County, Florida. He graduated from Jacksonville (Florida) Law College in 1936. He was admitted to the bar the same year and commenced practice in Jacksonville, Florida.

Political career
He served as member of the city council of Jacksonville from 1929 to 1932. Price was the Supervisor of Registration of Duval County from 1932 to 1942.

Congress
Price was elected as a Democrat to the Seventy-eighth and to the two succeeding Congresses (January 3, 1943 – January 3, 1949). He was an unsuccessful candidate for renomination in 1948 to the Eighty-first Congress. After leaving Congress, he resumed the practice of law and real estate pursuits.

Death
He died in Jacksonville on February 11, 1976, and was buried in Greenlawn Cemetery.

References

External links

 

1899 births
1976 deaths
Democratic Party members of the United States House of Representatives from Florida
Politicians from Jacksonville, Florida
Florida city council members
20th-century American politicians